Julio Robaina (born April 21, 1965) is an American  politician who was the mayor of Hialeah, Florida. He was first elected in 2005. Robaina was re-elected to a second term in office in 2009.

Robaina also serves as Hialeah's city manager.  His total annual compensation for both positions, including expenses and travel, is $261,010.

On April 12, 2011, Robaina announced his intention to resign as Mayor of Hialeah in order to campaign for the office of Mayor of Miami-Dade County. His resignation took effect on May 23, 2011.

On June 28, 2011, Robaina lost the election for the position of the office of Mayor of Miami-Dade County to Carlos A. Giménez.

References

Further reading

External links 
City of Hialeah (official site)

Living people
1965 births
Mayors of Hialeah, Florida
American politicians of Cuban descent
Florida Republicans
Hispanic and Latino American mayors in Florida
Hispanic and Latino American politicians
Latino conservatism in the United States